The Babylonian Map of the World (or Imago Mundi) is a Babylonian clay tablet
written in the Akkadian language. Dated to no earlier than the 9th century BC (with a late 8th or 7th date being more likely), it includes a brief and partially lost textual description. The tablet describes the oldest known depiction of the known world. Ever since its discovery there have been a variety of divergent views on what it represents in general and about specific features in particular.

The map is centered on the Euphrates, flowing from the north (top) to the south (bottom). The city of Babylon is shown on the Euphrates, in the northern half of the map. The mouth of the Euphrates is labelled "swamp" and "outflow". Susa, the capital of Elam, is shown to the south, Urartu to the northeast, and Habban, the capital of the Kassites is shown (incorrectly) to the northwest. Mesopotamia is surrounded by a circular "bitter river" or Ocean, and seven or eight "regions", depicted as triangular sections, are shown as lying beyond the Ocean. It has been suggested that the depiction of these "regions" as triangles might indicate that they were imagined as mountains.

The tablet was excavated by Hormuzd Rassam at Sippar, Baghdad vilayet, some 60 km north of Babylon on the east bank of the Euphrates River. It was acquired by the British Museum in 1882 (BM 92687); the text was first translated in 1889. The tablet is usually thought to have originated in Borsippa. In 1995 a new join to the tablet was discovered, at the point of the upper-most nagu.

Description of the tablet

The tablet consists of three parts: the world map, a text above the map, and a text on the back side of the tablet. It is not clear whether all three parts should be read as a single whole. Systematic differences between the texts suggest that the tablet may have been compiled from three separate documents.

The map 

The map is circular with two outer defined circles. Cuneiform script labels all locations inside the circular map, as well as a few regions outside. The two outer circles represent water in between and is labelled as  idmaratum "bitter river", the salt sea.
Babylon north of center of the map; parallel lines at the bottom seem to represent the southern marshes, and a curved line coming from the north, northeast appear to represent the Zagros Mountains.

There are seven small interior circles at the perimeter areas within the circle, and they appear to represent seven cities.
Seven or eight triangular sections on the external circle (water perimeter) represent named "regions" (nagu).
The description of five of them has survived.

Carlo Zaccagnini has argued that the design of the Babylonian map of the world may have lived on in the T and O maps of the European Middle Ages.

Accompanying texts

Front side 
The text above the map (11 lines) seems to describe part of the creation of the world by Marduk, the patron god of Babylon, who divided the primeval Ocean (the goddess Tiamat) and thus created Land and Sea. Of the Sea it says: 

 "the ruine[d] gods which he (Marduk) set[tled] inside the Sea [...] are present; the viper, the great sea-serpent inside." 

Next, on Land, a series of two mythical creatures ("the Anzu-bird, and scorpi[on-man]") and at least fifteen land animals are mentioned, "beasts which Marduk created on top of the res[tl]ess Sea" (i.e. on the land, visualized as a kind of giant raft floating in the Sea), among them mountain goat, gazelle, lion, wolf, monkey and female-monkey, ostrich, cat, and chameleon. With the exception of the cat, all these animals were typical of faraway lands. 

The last two lines of the text refer to three legendary heroes: [U]tnapištim (the hero of the Flood), Sargon (ruler of Akkad), and Nur-[D]agan the King of Buršaḫa[nda] (opponent of Sargon).

Back side 
The back side (29 lines) seems to be a description of (at least) eight nagu. After an introduction, possibly explaining how to identify the first nagu, the next seven nagu are each introduced by the clause "To the n-th region [nagu], where you travel 7 leagues" (the distance of 7 leagues seems to indicate the width of the Ocean, rather than the distance between subsequent nagu).

A short description is given for each of the eight nagu. The descriptions of the first, second, and sixth nagu are too damaged to be read. The fifth nagu has the longest description but this text too is so damaged that it is quite uncomprehensible. The seventh nagu is more clear:

 "... where cattle equipped with horns [are ...] they run fast and reach [...]". 

The third nagu may be a barren desert, impassable even for birds:

 "A winged [bi]rd cannot safely comp[lete its journey]"

In the fourth nagu objects are found of remarkable dimensions:

 "[...] are thick as a parsiktum-measure, 20 fingers [...]"

The eighth nagu may refer to a supposed heavenly gate in the east where the Sun enters as it rises in the morning.

 "[... the p]lace where [...] dawns at its entrance."

Concluding, the description then states that the map is a bird's eye description
 "of the Four Quadrants of the entire [world?] [...] which no one can compre[hend]" (i.e., the nagu extend infinitely far).

The last two lines apparently recorded the name of the scribe who wrote the tablet:
 "[...] copied from its old exemplar and colla[ted ...] the son of Iṣṣuru [the descend]ant of Ea-bēl-il[ī]."

See also
Babylon
Sippar
List of cities of the ancient Near East
Babylonian astronomy

References

Further reading
Finkel, Irving. 2008. The Babylonian Map of the World, or the Mappa Mundi. P. 17 in Babylon: Myth and Reality, ed. Irving Finkel and Michael Seymour. London: British Museum Press.
Finkel, Irving. 2014. The Ark Before Noah: Decoding the Story of the Flood. New York: Doubleday
Kerrigan, 2009. The Ancients in Their Own Words, Michael Kerrigan, Fall River Press, Amber Books Ltd, c 2009. (hardcover. )

Millard, Alan. 1987. Cartography in the Ancient Near East. Pp. 107–16 in The History of Cartography Volume One: Cartography in Prehistoric, Ancient, and Medieval Europe and the Mediterranean, ed. John B. Harley and David Woodward. Chicago: The University of Chicago Press
Muhly, James. 1978. Ancient Cartography: Man’s Earliest Attempts to Represent His World. Expedition 20/2: 26–31

External links
Full Obverse view, British Museum site
Full Reverse view, British Museum site
Line drawing, Obverse & Reverse
British Museum, Map of the World, Photo & Analysis
Google Arts & Culture – Map of the World from the collection of the British Museum
Tablet photo, and graphic of map with names
The Story of Geographical Discovery; Chapter 1, The World as Known to the Ancients, gutenberg.com; Black and White photo, (1.5X)
3D model (Sketchfab)

Gallery

6th-century BC inscriptions
1889 archaeological discoveries
Historic maps of the world
Clay tablets
Middle Eastern objects in the British Museum
Historic maps of Asia
Sippar